Hafslo is a former municipality in the old Sogn og Fjordane county, Norway.  The  municipality existed from 1838 until its dissolution in 1963. It is located in the present-day Luster Municipality (in Vestland county) in the traditional district of Sogn. The former municipality included the villages of Kinsedalen, Ornes, and Kroken on the east side of the Lustrafjorden.  It also included the villages of Solvorn, Hafslo, Joranger, and the whole Veitastrond valley on the west side of the Lustrafjorden.  The municipality surrounded the lakes Hafslovatnet and Veitastrondvatnet.  The administrative centre of the municipality was the village of Hafslo, where Hafslo Church was located.

Name
The name comes from the old Hafslo farm, since Hafslo Church is located there.  The first element of the name comes from the old male name Hafr or from the word for "goat" (also hafr).  The second element of the name comes from the old word ló meaning "meadow", probably due to the excellent farming areas nearby.

History
Hafslo was established as a municipality on 1 January 1838 (see formannskapsdistrikt law). During the 1960s, there were many municipal mergers across Norway due to the work of the Schei Committee. On 1 January 1963, the municipality of Hafslo (population: 2,384) was merged with the neighboring municipalities of Luster (population: 2,674) and Jostedal (population: 796) to form the new, larger municipality of Luster.

Government

Municipal council
The municipal council  of Hafslo was made up of 21 representatives that were elected to four year terms.  The party breakdown of the final municipal council was as follows:

Notable residents
 Sylfest Lomheim (born 1945) – Norwegian linguist
 Jens Sterri (born 1923) – civil servant
 Kjellfred Weum (born 1940) – hurdler

Media gallery

See also
List of former municipalities of Norway

References

External links

Luster, Norway
Former municipalities of Norway
1838 establishments in Norway
1963 disestablishments in Norway